Pseudocentrum is a genus of flowering plants from the orchid family, Orchidaceae. It is native to Central America, the West Indies and northern South America.

Species recognized as of June 2014:

Pseudocentrum bursarium Rchb.f. - Colombia, Ecuador, Peru
Pseudocentrum guadalupense Cogn. in I.Urban - Guadeloupe
Pseudocentrum hoffmannii (Rchb.f.) Rchb.f. - Costa Rica, Panama
Pseudocentrum macrostachyum Lindl.  - Colombia, Ecuador, Peru
Pseudocentrum minus Benth. - Jamaica, Dominican Republic
Pseudocentrum purdii Garay - Colombia
Pseudocentrum sylvicola Rchb.f. - Colombia, Ecuador

References

External links 

Swiss Orchid Foundation at Herberium Jany renz, Pseudocentrum purdii Garay
Plant illustrations, Pseudocentrum

Cranichideae genera
Cranichidinae